Manohar Malgonkar (Marathi:  [12 July 1913- 14 June, 2010] [karwar district|was an Indian author of both fiction and nonfiction in the English language. He was also an army officer, a big game hunter, a civil servant, a mine owner and a farmer.

Life
Malgonkar was born in Jagalbet village Karwar dist, near Londa in Belgaum district. From his maternal side, his great-grandfather had been governor of Gwalior State. He began his education in Belgaum. He later attended school in Dharwad and graduated from Mumbai University. After, he joined the army and rose to the rank of Lieutenant Colonel in the Maratha Light Infantry. He retired from service at the age of 39. He also stood for parliament.

Most of that activity was during the build-up to Indian independence and its aftermath, often the settings for his works. The socio-historical milieux of those times form the backdrop of his novels, which are usually of action and adventure. He also wrote non-fiction, including biography and history.

Malgonkar lived in a remote bungalow called 'Burbusa Bungalow' located at Jagalbet in Joida Taluk in Uttara Kannada District, Karnataka. His only child Suneeta, who was educated at the famous Lawrence School, Sanawar, died in 1998.

Works
For many years, Malgonkar wrote a weekly column covering a wide range of topics, which was published in Indian newspapers like The Statesman and Deccan Herald. Most of his books were published in India by Orient Paperbacks or by Rupa Paperbacks.

Novels
The Sea Hawk: Life and Battles of Kanhoji Angrey (1959)
Distant Drum (1960)
A Combat of Shadows (1962)
The Princes (1963)
 A Bend in the Ganges (1964)
 Spy in Amber (1971)
 The Devil’s Wind (on the life on Peshwa Nana Sahib) (1972)
 Shalimar (1978) [Novelization of the film Shalimar]
 Bandicoot Run (1982)

Historical accounts
 Puars (Pawars) of Dewas Senior (1963)
 Chhatrapatis of Kolhapur (1971)
 The Men Who Killed Gandhi (1978)
 Cue from the Inner Voice: The Choice Before Big Business (1980)
 Dropping Names (1996)

Short Stories 
 A Teller of Tales
 The Garland Keepers
 Cactus Country
 A Toast in Warm Wine and Other Short Stories (1974)
 In Uniform
 Bombay Beware (1975)
 Rumble-Tumble (1977)
 Four Graves and Other Stories (1990)
 Inside Goa
 Two Red Roosters

References

Padmanabhan, A., "The Fictional World of Manohar Malgonkar", Atlantic Publications, 2002.

Janet M. Powers. "Manohar Malgonkar" South Asian Novelists in English. Ed. Jaina C. Sanga. Greenwood Publishing Group, 2003. 136-143

External links
 Officers and Gentlemen, a 2000 article
 Picture of Manohar Malgonkar at Kamat.com
 "Manohar Malgonkar's contribution to Indian writing in English remains largely unacknowledged", DNA (Daily News and Analysis), Bangalore, June 17, 2010
 Padmanabhan, A. "The Fictional World of Manohar Malgonkar." PhD Thesis 1988 at Shodhganga@INFLIBNET

20th-century Indian novelists
1913 births
2010 deaths
English-language writers from India
People from Uttara Kannada
Novelists from Karnataka